Deer Mountain Campground is located on U.S. Route 3 in  Connecticut Lakes State Forest in Pittsburg, New Hampshire. Activities include camping, picnicking, canoeing and fishing. The campground is adjacent to the Connecticut River between Second and Third Connecticut Lakes and is just five minutes south of the Canadian border. There are 25 primitive sites. The area is known for moose watching.

The park is 1 of 10 New Hampshire state parks that are in the path of totality for the 2024 solar eclipse, with 3 minutes and 22 seconds of totality.

References

External links
Deer Mountain Campground  New Hampshire Department of Natural and Cultural Resources

State parks of New Hampshire
Parks in Coös County, New Hampshire
Pittsburg, New Hampshire